The 1963 Italian Grand Prix was a Formula One motor race held at Monza on September 8, 1963. It was the seventh of ten races in both the 1963 World Championship of Drivers and the 1963 International Cup for Formula One Manufacturers. At this race, Scottish driver Jim Clark clinched the World Championship crown with three races to go, the first time anyone had done so.

The organisers had planned to run on the full 10 km circuit but the very bumpy (and in some places ruined) nature of the banked concrete curves provoked much criticism and also caused accidents. Therefore, at the drivers' request, for the next day it was decided to revert to the 5.75 km road layout.

This race was Scuderia Ferrari's 100th start in a World Championship event as a team. Jim Clark became the first driver to win the World Drivers' Championship with 3 races left to go. Lotus-Climax also won the Constructors' Championship.

Classification

Qualifying 

Notes
  – Only 20 cars were permitted to take the start. Chris Amon's practice accident left him hospitalised, leaving him unable to take the start. This would have promoted Mário de Araújo Cabral, who was 21st in qualifying, onto the starting grid. However, on race day, Giancarlo Baghetti, who was 25th quickest in qualifying, lined up on the starting grid. A race report from the time speculated that this was as a result of the race organisers arranging for Baghetti to start so there could be an additional Italian driver in the race.

Race

Championship standings after the race 

Drivers' Championship standings

Constructors' Championship standings

 Notes: Only the top five positions are included for both sets of standings. Only the best 6 results counted towards the Championship. Numbers without parentheses are Championship points; numbers in parentheses are total points scored.

References

Italian Grand Prix
Italian Grand Prix
1963 in Italian motorsport